The cock flag is the flag of the Hindu deity Kartikeya, also rendered Skanda, and Murugan in Tamil tradition. The deity Murugan is depicted with the divine spear vel in one hand and the cock flag in the other in his iconography.

Legend

According to the Kanda Puranam, the deity Murugan is regarded to have battled the asura Surapadman with the divine spear given to him by his mother, Parvati. After Surapadman had assumed the form of a tree, Murugan used his spear to split the asura into two. These halves became a peacock, which Murugan took as his mount, and a rooster, which he adopted as his flag. This legend is celebrated on the occasion of Skanda Shashti.

In the Mahabharata, the cock is offered as the emblem of Skanda by Agni before his battle with Tarakasura.

See also 

 Vel
 Shankha
 Hindu iconography

References 

Flags of Tamils
Hindu gods
Kaumaram
Tamil deities
Flags displaying animals
Hindu iconography